= Amy Landers =

American lawyer

Amy L. Landers is an American lawyer, currently at Drexel University and formerly a distinguished professor at University of the Pacific.
